In abstract algebra, the split-quaternions  or coquaternions form an algebraic structure introduced by James Cockle in 1849 under the latter name. They form an associative algebra of dimension four over the real numbers.

After introduction in the 20th century of coordinate-free definitions of rings and algebras, it was proved that the algebra of split-quaternions is isomorphic to the ring of the  real matrices. So the study of split-quaternions can be reduced to the study of real matrices, and this may explain why there are few mentions of split-quaternions in the mathematical literature of the 20th and 21st centuries.

Definition

The split-quaternions are the linear combinations (with real coefficients) of four basis elements  that satisfy the following product rules:
, 
, 
,
.
By associativity, these relations imply
, 
,
and also .

They form also a noncommutative ring, by extending the above product rules by distributivity to all split-quaternions.

Let consider the square matrices

They satisfy the same multiplication table as the corresponding split-quaternions.

The above multiplication rules imply that the eight elements  form a group under this multiplication, which is isomorphic to the dihedral group D4, the symmetry group of a square.

Properties

Like the quaternions introduced by Hamilton in 1843, they form a four dimensional real associative algebra. But like the matrices and unlike the quaternions, the split-quaternions contain nontrivial zero divisors, nilpotent elements, and idempotents. As an algebra over the real numbers, the algebra of split-quaternions is isomorphic to the algebra of 2×2 real matrices by the above defined isomorphism. 

This isomorphism allows identifying each split-quaternion with a 2×2 matrix. So every property of split-quaternions corresponds to a similar property of matrices, which is often named differently. 

The conjugate of a split-quaternion
In term of matrices, the conjugate is the cofactor matrix obtained by exchanging the diagonal entries and changing of sign the two other entries.

The product of a split-quaternion with its conjugate is the isotropic quadratic form:

which is called the norm of the split-quaternion or the determinant of the associated matrix.

It equals the trace of associated matrix.

The norm of a product of two split-quaternions is the product of their norms. Equivalently, the determinant of a product of matrices is the product of their determinants. 

This means that split-quaternions and 2×2 matrices form a composition algebra. As there are nonzero split-quaternions having a zero norm, split-quaternions form a "split composition algebra" – hence their name.

A split-quaternion with a nonzero norm has a multiplicative inverse, namely . In terms of matrix, this is Cramer rule that asserts that a matrix is invertible if and only its determinant is nonzero, and, in this case, the inverse of the matrix is the quotient of the cofactor matrix by the determinant.

Representation as complex matrices
There is a representation of the split-quaternions as a unital associative subalgebra of the  matrices with complex entries. This representation can be defined by the algebra homomorphism that maps a split-quaternion  to the matrix

Here,  (italic) is the imaginary unit, which must not be confused with the basic split quaternion  (upright roman).

The image of this homomorphism is the matrix ring formed by the matrices of the form

where the superscript  denotes a complex conjugate.

This homomorphism maps respectively the split-quaternions  on the matrices

The proof that this representation is an algebra homomorphism is straightforward but requires some boring computations, which can be avoided by starting from the expression of split-quaternions as  real matrices, and using matrix similarity. Let  be the matrix 

Then, applied to the representation of split-quaternions as  real matrices, the above algebra homomorphism is the matrix similarity.

It follows almost immediately that for a split quaternion represented as a complex matrix, the conjugate is the matrix of the cofactors, and the norm is the determinant.

With the representation of split quaternions as complex matrices. the matrices of quaternions of norm  are exactly the elements of the special unitary group SU(1,1). This is used for in hyperbolic geometry for describing  hyperbolic motions of the Poincaré disk model.

Generation from split-complex numbers

Split-quaternions may be generated by modified Cayley-Dickson construction similar to the method of L. E. Dickson and Adrian Albert. for the division algebras C, H, and O. The multiplication rule

is used when producing the doubled product in the real-split cases. The doubled conjugate  so that

If a and b are split-complex numbers and split-quaternion 

then

Stratification

In this section, the subalgebras generated by a single split-quaternion are studied and classified.

Let  be a split-quaternion. Let  be its nonreal part. One has , and therefore  It follows that  is a real number if and only  is either a real number ( and ) or a purely nonreal split quaternion ( and ).

The structure of the subalgebra  generated by  follows straightforwardly. One has 

and this is a commutative algebra. Its dimension is two except if  is real (in this case, the subalgebra is simply ). 

The nonreal elements of  whose square is real have the form  with  

Three cases have to be considered, which are detailed in the next subsections.

Nilpotent case 

This is a parametrization of all split-quaternions whose nonreal part is nilpotent. 

This is also a parameterization of these subalgebras by the points of a circle: the split-quaternions of the form  form a circle; a subalgebra generated by a nilpotent element contains exactly one point of the circle; and the circle does not contain any other point.  

Decomposable case

This is the case where . Letting   one has

It follows that  belongs to the hyperboloid of two sheets of equation  Therefore, there are real numbers  such that  and 

This is a parametrization of all split-quaternions whose nonreal part has a positive norm.

This is also a parameterization of the corresponding subalgebras by the pairs of opposite points of a hyperboloid of two sheets: the split-quaternions of the form  form a hyperboloid of two sheets; a subalgebra generated by a split-quaternion with a nonreal part of positive norm contains exactly two opposite points on this hyperboloid, one on each sheet; and the hyperboloid does not contain any other point.

Indecomposable case

This is the case where . Letting   one has

It follows that  belongs to the hyperboloid of one sheet of equation  Therefore, there are real numbers  such that  and 

This is a parametrization of all split-quaternions whose nonreal part has a negative norm.

This is also a parameterization of the corresponding subalgebras by the pairs of opposite points of a hyperboloid of one sheet: the split-quaternions of the form  form a hyperboloid of one sheet; a subalgebra generated by a split-quaternion with a nonreal part of negative norm contains exactly two opposite points on this hyperboloid; and the hyperboloid does not contain any other point.

Stratification by the norm
As seen above, the purely nonreal split-quaternions of norm  and  form respectively a hyperboloid of one sheet, a hyperboloid of two sheets and a circular cone in the space of non real quaternions.

These surfaces are pairwise asymptote and do not intersect. Their complement consist of six connected regions:
 the two regions located on the concave side of the hyperboloid of two sheets, where 
 the two regions between the hyperboloid of two sheets and the cone, where 
 the region between the cone and the hyperboloid of one sheet where 
 the region outside the hyperboloid of one sheet, where 

This stratification can be refined by considering split-quaternions of a fixed norm: for every real number  the purely nonreal split-quaternions of norm  form an hyperboloid. All these hyperboloids are asymptote to the above cone, and none of these surfaces intersect any other. As the set of the purely nonreal split-quaternions is the disjoint union of these surfaces, this provides the desired stratification.

Historical notes

The coquaternions were initially introduced (under that name) in 1849 by James Cockle in the London–Edinburgh–Dublin Philosophical Magazine. The introductory papers by Cockle were recalled in the 1904 Bibliography of the Quaternion Society. Alexander Macfarlane called the structure of split-quaternion vectors an exspherical system when he was speaking at the International Congress of Mathematicians in Paris in 1900.

The unit sphere was considered in 1910 by Hans Beck. For example, the dihedral group appears on page 419. The split-quaternion structure has also been mentioned briefly in the Annals of Mathematics.

In 1995 Ian Porteous placed split-quaternions in the context of Clifford algebra and hypercomplex numbers.

Synonyms
 Para-quaternions (Ivanov and Zamkovoy 2005, Mohaupt 2006) Manifolds with para-quaternionic structures are studied in differential geometry and string theory. In the para-quaternionic literature k is replaced with −k.
 Exspherical system (Macfarlane 1900)
 Split-quaternions (Rosenfeld 1988)
 Antiquaternions (Rosenfeld 1988)
 Pseudoquaternions (Yaglom 1968 Rosenfeld 1988)

See also
 Pauli matrices
 Split-biquaternions
 Split-octonions
 Dual quaternions

Notes

Further reading
 Brody, Dorje C., and Eva-Maria Graefe. "On complexified mechanics and coquaternions." Journal of Physics A: Mathematical and Theoretical 44.7 (2011): 072001. 
 Ivanov, Stefan; Zamkovoy, Simeon (2005), "Parahermitian and paraquaternionic manifolds", Differential Geometry and its Applications 23, pp. 205–234, .
 Mohaupt, Thomas (2006), "New developments in special geometry", .
 Özdemir, M. (2009) "The roots of a split quaternion", Applied Mathematics Letters 22:258–63. 
 Özdemir, M. & A.A. Ergin (2006) "Rotations with timelike quaternions in Minkowski 3-space", Journal of Geometry and Physics 56: 322–36.
 Pogoruy, Anatoliy & Ramon M Rodrigues-Dagnino (2008) Some algebraic and analytical properties of coquaternion algebra, Advances in Applied Clifford Algebras.

Composition algebras
Quaternions
Hyperbolic geometry
Special relativity